Oryol, alternatively spelled Orel, is the name of several inhabited localities in Russia.

Urban localities
Oryol, a city in Oryol Oblast; 

Rural localities
Orel, Altai Krai, a settlement in Zelenoroshchinsky Selsoviet of Rebrikhinsky District in Altai Krai; 
Orel, Chuvash Republic, a settlement in Berezovskoye Rural Settlement of Ibresinsky District in the Chuvash Republic
Orel, Nizhny Novgorod Oblast, a village in Strelsky Selsoviet of Vadsky District in Nizhny Novgorod Oblast; 
Orel, Novgorod Oblast, a village in Borovskoye Settlement of Khvoyninsky District in Novgorod Oblast
Orel, Perm Krai, a settlement in Usolsky District of Perm Krai
Orel, Primorsky Krai, a khutor in Partizansky District of Primorsky Krai
Orel (Polnovskaya Rural Settlement), Gdovsky District, Pskov Oblast, a village in Gdovsky District of Pskov Oblast; municipally, a part of Polnovskaya Rural Settlement of that district
Orel (Dobruchinskaya Rural Settlement), Gdovsky District, Pskov Oblast, a village in Gdovsky District of Pskov Oblast; municipally, a part of Dobruchinskaya Rural Settlement of that district
Orel, Republic of Tatarstan, a village in Laishevsky District of the Republic of Tatarstan
Orel, Vologda Oblast, a village in Merezhsky Selsoviet of Ustyuzhensky District in Vologda Oblast